Michael Santos Silva Alves (born February 16, 1996) is a Brazilian footballer who plays as a midfielder for Bulgarian club Cherno More Varna.

Career
In 2018 Michael joined J2 League club FC Gifu. He made his debut on 4 August in a match against Tochigi and scored two goals in 12 matches for two years.

References

External links
 Player Profile at Soccerway 

1996 births
Living people
Brazilian footballers
Brazilian expatriate footballers
J2 League players
FC Gifu players
PFC Cherno More Varna players
Expatriate footballers in Japan
Expatriate footballers in Portugal
Expatriate footballers in Bulgaria
Association football forwards